Ana Matos Fernandes, better known by the stage name Capicua, is a Portuguese rapper from Porto.

Biography
Ana Matos Fernandes was born in Porto, Portugal and graduated in Sociology in ISCTE and got her PhD in Human Geography at  Barcelona. Nonetheless, she always wanted to make music. Her songs started to reach the mainstream media in 2012. She began making collaborations with several artists, such as Sérgio Godinho, Sam the Kid and DJ Ride. Her work is strongly influenced by Portuguese poets, such as Sophia de Mello Breyner.

Discography 
 2021 - Encore (Live EP)
 2020 - Madrepérola
 2015 - Medusa	
 2014 - Sereia Louca (LP)   	
 2013 - Capicua goes West (Mixtape Vol.2)    	
 2012 - Capicua (LP)
 2008 - Capicua goes Preemo (Mixtape Vol.1)
 2007 - Mau Feitio	
 2006- Syzygy (EP)

References

External links
  

Living people
Portuguese rappers
Portuguese songwriters
1982 births
Musicians from Porto